Mark Maggiori (born June 16, 1977) is a French-American painter, graphic designer, draftsman, musician, music video director and lead vocalist of the nu metal band Pleymo. He is noted for paintings of American cowboys, Native Americans and the American Southwest.

Early life and education
Maggiori was born in Fontainebleau, in 1977. At the age of 15, during his first visit to the United States, Maggiori went on a month-long road trip from New York City to San Francisco and visited several National Parks and other sites in the Southwestern United States. He later cited that trip as the beginning of his fascination with the Southwest and the inspiration behind his Western art.

Maggiori graduated from the Académie Julian in Paris, where he was formally trained in academic drawing.

Music

From 1997 to 2007, Maggiori served as the lead vocalist, graphic designer, and music video director for his band, Pleymo. After signing with Epic Records the band released four studio albums and toured internationally. Pleymo went on a hiatus after 2007, but reunited in 2018 with Maggiori once again providing lead vocals. After the reunion tour announcement for the Paris concert the band had sold out Le Trianon in Paris in less than a day.

List of Pleymo music videos 

 2002 : « New Wave » (Episode 2 : Medecine Cake)

 2002 : « United Nowhere » (Episode 2 : Medecine Cake)

 2003 : « Divine Excuse » (Rock)

 2004 : « Modaddiction » (Rock)

 2004 : « On ne changera rien » (Rock [réédition])

 2005 : « Rock » (Rock)

 2006 : « Adrenaline » (Alphabet Prison)

 2007 : « L'instinct et l'Envie » (Alphabet Prison)

Other music Videos 

 2008 : Like A Hobo de Charlie Winston

 2009 : Apprends-Moi de Superbus

 2010 : Laisse Aller de Vadel

 2010 : I Love Your Smile de Charlie Winston

 2010 : Help Myself (Nous ne faisons que passer) de Gaetan Roussel

 2010 : Mes défauts de Superbus

 2010 : La Vengeance d'une Louve de Brigitte

 2010 : Ma Benz de Brigitte (Cover de NTM)

 2010 : Battez-vous de Brigitte

 2011 : I love you, mais encore des Starliners

 2011 : This is a love song de Lilly Wood & The Prick

 2012 : Drama Queen de Vadel

 2012 : Des mots invincibles de Leslie

 2013 : Paranoïak de Seth Gueko

 2014 : Comment faire des Plastiscines

Fine art

Maggiori began painting Western scenes in 2014. Since then, his works have been featured in Forbes, Flaunt, Art of the West, Southwest Art, Western Horseman and others. Maggiori has been noted in particular for the way he paints clouds in his landscape scenes, with Christopher Barker describing them as, "layered, textural monuments that both dwarf and magnify the subject with impossible detail."

In addition to published features, Maggiori'is paintings have been exhibited in the Briscoe Western Art Museum in San Antonio, the Eiteljorg Museum of American Indians and Western Art in Indianapolis, the Autry Museum of the American West and the Maxwell Alexander Gallery in Los Angeles.

Beginning in 2017, he began to work en plein air in New Mexico, Arizona and Wyoming. Maggiori's style and technique has drawn comparisons to Western artists Frederic Remington and Frank Tenney Johnson. Gallery owner Beau Alexander has noted that Maggiori's paintings are unique because of his outside perspective, having not grown up in the culture of the West and that "[He] goes to great lengths to have the cowboys depicted accurately...he will use colors and techniques learned in his photo and film days to create a more dramatic scene."

References

External links
Paintings

The Monsoon Sun (2016 William B. Travis Awards for Patrons Choice)
The Journey West (2017 Sam Houston Awards for Best Painting)
West Side of the Rio Grande (2018 Don B. Huntley Spirit of the West Award)
Purple Haze (2019 Don B. Huntley Spirit of the West Award)

1977 births
Artists of the American West
People from Fontainebleau
Académie Julian alumni
21st-century French painters
21st-century French male artists
Living people